John Maywood Grubb, Jr. (born August 4, 1948 in Richmond, Virginia) is a former Major League Baseball outfielder and designated hitter, who also occasionally played at first base. He played with the San Diego Padres (1972–1976), Cleveland Indians (1977–1978), Texas Rangers (1978–1982), and the Detroit Tigers (1983–1987).

Major League career
Grubb was drafted by the San Diego Padres in 1971 with the 24th pick in the first round. He had been previously drafted by the Boston Red Sox, Cincinnati Reds, and Atlanta Braves, but did not sign with them. He made his major league debut on September 10, 1972.

In his 1973 rookie season, Grubb put up good numbers and earned himself a starting position in the outfield by hitting .311 with eight home runs, 37 RBI, and 52 runs scored. Grubb made the 1974 National League All-star team during his sophomore season, and struck out in his only at-bat. 

Highlights after the 1974 season included a 21-game hitting streak in 1979 while a member of the Texas Rangers. He was nearly dealt along with Sparky Lyle from the Rangers to the Philadelphia Phillies for Tug McGraw, Bake McBride and Larry Christenson at the 1979 Winter Meetings in Toronto, but the proposed transaction was never executed because a deferred money issue in Lyle's contract went unresolved.

Grubb was also a member of the Detroit Tigers' 1984 World Series Championship team; the Tigers defeated his former team the San Diego Padres 4 games to 1. In his 16-year career, he posted a .278 batting average with 99 home runs, 475 RBI, and 553 runs scored. In the era since the designated hitter came into play (1973), he is the all-time leader among American League players when used as a pinch hitter batting for the #9 hitter in the line-up. He was released by the Detroit Tigers after a disappointing 1987 season, despite having arguably the best season of his career in 1986.

Personal life
Since retiring from professional baseball, Grubb has kept a low profile. He was the former varsity baseball coach at his alma mater, Meadowbrook High School in Richmond. There he coached former San Diego Padres pitcher Cla Meredith. Grubb and his wife are also active members of the Christian Church (Disciples of Christ).

See also
 1984 Detroit Tigers season

References

External links

Johnny Grubb at SABR (Baseball BioProject)
Johnny Grubb at Baseball Almanac

1948 births
National League All-Stars
Living people
San Diego Padres players
Cleveland Indians players
Texas Rangers players
Detroit Tigers players
Baseball players from Richmond, Virginia
Major League Baseball left fielders
Major League Baseball center fielders
Major League Baseball right fielders
Nashville Sounds players
Orlando Juice players
Richmond Braves players
SCF Manatees baseball players
Florida State Seminoles baseball players
State College of Florida, Manatee–Sarasota alumni